Mike Herrmann (born 26 July 1966) is a German sports shooter. He competed in the men's 50 metre running target event at the 1988 Summer Olympics.

References

External links
 

1966 births
Living people
German male sport shooters
Olympic shooters of East Germany
Shooters at the 1988 Summer Olympics
People from Rudolstadt
Sportspeople from Thuringia